Joshua Samwel Nassari is a Tanzanian CHADEMA politician and Member of Parliament for Arumeru East  constituency since 2012.

References

Living people
Chadema MPs
Tanzanian MPs 2010–2015
University of Dar es Salaam alumni
1985 births